The following is a list of songs written about Chennai, the capital city of Tamilnadu province of India:

"Chennai City Gangstar" - a song from Venakkam Chennai (2013), sung by Annirudh Ravichander, Hard Kaur and Hiphop Tamizha
"Chennai Express" - title song from Chennai Express (2013) sung by S. P. Balasubrahmanyam and Jonita Gandhi
 "Madras Nalla Madras" - a 1967 Tamil sing composed by M. S. Viswanathan
 "Madras A Suthi Paka Poren" - a 1994 Tamil song composed by A. R. Rahman
 "Vanakam Vazha Veikum Chennai" - a 2012 song from the film Vanakkam Chennai
 "Enga Ooru Madras" - a 2014 Tamil song composed by Santosh Narayanan
 "Porambokku Paadal" - a classical song
 "The Madras Song - a 2014 Tamil song by Murugappa Group in celebration of 375 years of Madras State.

References

Chennai
Culture of Chennai
Songs about India
Songs